Yevgeny Zhigulin (born 28 June 1980) is a Russian rower. He competed in the men's coxless four event at the 2004 Summer Olympics.

References

1980 births
Living people
Russian male rowers
Olympic rowers of Russia
Rowers at the 2004 Summer Olympics
Rowers from Saint Petersburg